Melvin Adrien (born 30 August 1993) is a professional footballer who plays as a goalkeeper for Championnat National 2 club Thonon Evian. Born in Réunion, he plays for the Madagascar national team.

Club career
Born in Le Port, Réunion, Adrien has played club football for Créteil B, Mouscron-Péruwelz B, Mulhouse, AC Amiens, Martigues, and Louhans-Cuiseaux.

On 15 June 2022, Adrien joined newly-promoted Championnat National 2 side Thonon Evian.

International career 
Adrien made his international debut for Madagascar in 2017.

Career statistics

International

References

External links
 

1993 births
Living people
Association football goalkeepers
French footballers
Footballers from Réunion
People of Malagasy descent from Réunion
People with acquired Malagasy citizenship
Malagasy footballers
Black French sportspeople
French sportspeople of Malagasy descent
Madagascar international footballers
US Créteil-Lusitanos players
Royal Excel Mouscron players
FC Mulhouse players
AC Amiens players
FC Martigues players
Thonon Evian Grand Genève F.C. players
Championnat National 2 players
French expatriate footballers
Malagasy expatriate footballers
French expatriate sportspeople in Belgium
Malagasy expatriate sportspeople in Belgium
Expatriate footballers in Belgium
2019 Africa Cup of Nations players